Harald Ambros (born 19 March 1980) is an Austrian equestrian. He competed in the Individual eventing at the 2004, 2008 and 2012 Summer Olympics.

Ambros was born in Linz.

References

External links

1980 births
Austrian male equestrians
Living people
Olympic equestrians of Austria
Equestrians at the 2004 Summer Olympics
Equestrians at the 2008 Summer Olympics
Equestrians at the 2012 Summer Olympics